Miguel David Terans Pérez (born 11 August 1994), known as David Terans, is a Uruguayan professional footballer who plays for Athletico Paranaense and the Uruguay national team. Mainly a forward, he can also play as an attacking midfielder.

Club career

Rentistas
Born in Montevideo, Terans joined Rentistas' youth ranks in 2010. He was promoted to the main squad in 2013 and promptly secured a spot in the starting team, making 21 appearances and scoring seven goals during his first season in the Uruguayan Primera División.

Santiago Wanderers (loan)
In July 2016, he was sent on loan to Chilean club Santiago Wanderers, where he made 25 appearances and scored six goals in the 2016–17 Chilean Primera División season.

Danubio (loan)
On 26 July 2017, Terans joined Danubio on a year-long loan. He scored eight goals in 14 matches in the 2017 Torneo Clausura, helping Danubio secure the last Uruguayan berth in the 2018 Copa Sudamericana. In 2018, he finished as top goalscorer in the Torneo Apertura with 10 goals and scored four times in the Torneo Intermedio.

Atlético Mineiro
On 15 June 2018, Terans joined Brazilian club Atlético Mineiro on a five-year deal.

Peñarol (loan)
On 14 January 2020, Terans joined Peñarol on a season-long loan, which was eventually extended for an additional year.

Athletico Paranaense
On 22 May 2021, Terans signed a four-year deal with Athletico Paranaense.

International career
In August 2021, Terans received his first call-up to the Uruguay national team for 2022 FIFA World Cup qualification matches against Peru, Bolivia and Ecuador. He made his debut on 2 September 2021 in a 1–1 draw against Peru. On 21 October 2022, he was named in Uruguay's 55-man preliminary squad for the 2022 FIFA World Cup.

Career statistics

Club

International

References

External links
 
 

1994 births
Living people
Uruguayan footballers
Uruguay international footballers
Uruguayan expatriate footballers
C.A. Rentistas players
Santiago Wanderers footballers
Danubio F.C. players
Clube Atlético Mineiro players
Peñarol players
Club Athletico Paranaense players
Uruguayan Primera División players
Chilean Primera División players
Campeonato Brasileiro Série A players
Expatriate footballers in Chile
Expatriate footballers in Brazil
Uruguayan expatriate sportspeople in Chile
Uruguayan expatriate sportspeople in Brazil
Association football midfielders